Kryszyn  is a village in the administrative district of Gmina Telatyn, within Tomaszów Lubelski County, Lublin Voivodeship, in eastern Poland.

The village has a population of 460.

References

Kryszyn